is a Japanese former professional baseball pitcher. He played for the Fukuoka SoftBank Hawks and Yomiuri Giants of the Nippon Professional Baseball (NPB) from 2007 to 2019.

On December 2, 2019, he become free agent.

References

External links

NPB stats

1986 births
Baseball people from Aichi Prefecture
Fukuoka SoftBank Hawks players
Japanese baseball players
Living people
Nippon Professional Baseball pitchers
People from Toyohashi
Yomiuri Giants players
2013 World Baseball Classic players